Luis Lobo-Guerrero (born 21 August 1976) is professor of History and Theory of International Relations at the University of Groningen.

Career 

Lobo-Guerrero has worked mainly in the field of International Relations with a specific interest in post-structuralist thought, history of early modern science, historical epistemology, and geopolitics. He has worked on the politics of international security focussing on the role of insurance as a technology for governing uncertainty. He has been a key proponent of the idea of biopolitics of security as an approach that features life as the referent object of security analysis. Currently, he works on  the ideas and practices that made it possible to think about the global in the 16th century, and in so doing, explores how globality can be understood as a connectivity effect.

Publications 
Monographs

Insuring Life: Value, Security and Risk (London: Routledge, 2016).

Insuring War: Sovereignty, Security and Risk (London: Routledge, 2013).

Insuring Security: Biopolitics, Security and Risk (London: Routledge, 2012).

Edited volumes

Mapping, Connectivity, and the Making of European Empires. Luis Lobo-Guerrero, Laura Lo Presti, and Filipe dos Reis, eds. (London: Rowman and Littlefield, forthcoming 2021).

Imaginaries of Connectivity – the creation of novel spaces of governance, Lobo-Guerrero, Luis, Suvi Alt, and Maarten Meijer, eds. (London: Rowman and Littlefield, 2019)

References 

Academic staff of the University of Groningen
International relations scholars
1976 births
Living people
Nationality missing
Pontifical Xavierian University alumni
Alumni of Lancaster University